Sigma Delta Chi sorority was a collegiate organization operating in Missouri from 1902 until 1915.

History 
In April, 1902, on the campus of Northeast Missouri State University, four girls formed a "friendship club". The club grew to nine members and the name T.T.C. was adopted. When the club grew to twelve members, the name was changed to A.O.T. It is reported that one member "could not keep her pledge," so a more "permanent" organization was formed. Thus begins the Alpha chapter of Sigma Delta Chi sorority.

In the summer months of 1902, the "initiatory and christening service" were crafted, along with important documents. In the fall of 1902, the Beta chapter at Warrensburg Teachers College (Central Missouri) was chartered. Two years later, the Gamma chapter was chartered at Forest Park Academy and Delta at Northwest Missouri State University.

Conclaves were held every two years, beginning in 1906. The final conclave, in 1912, ruled that the sorority would only charter at normal schools. The Gamma chapter was lost as a result.

The Delta chapter dissolved in 1915 per a university ban on secret organizations. Northwest Missouri State University records gave its final date as March 18, 1914.

With only two chapters left, members decided to petition a national sorority. In October 1915, Alpha chapter sent a petition to Sigma Sigma Sigma. On November 11, 1915, it was installed as the Mu chapter of Sigma Sigma Sigma. Ryle's history book stated, "All indicators point to a very pleasant evening, yet the girls must have thought of the old Sigma Delta Chi, now taking its place permanently in the history of the college."

Chapters 
Chapters and their outcome.

Insignia 
The emblem of A.O.T. was a crescent encircling a clover, with the club's initials on the leaves.

The pin of Sigma Delta Chi was a gold bow and arrow; the colors turquoise and wine; the flower the white carnation.

Footnotes

References 

Defunct fraternities and sororities
1902 establishments in Missouri
Truman State University
Student organizations established in 1902